The Nurse Practitioner Associates for Continuing Education (NPACE) is a non-profit organization based in the United States that provides continuing education to nurse practitioners and advanced practice clinicians.

History
NPACE was formed in 1980 by a small group of New England Nurse Practitioners. At the time, there was a lack of conferences that addressed the specific educational requirements of Nurse Practitioners (NP). Up to this point, nurse practitioners attended educational conferences designed for physicians. Noticing this void, the NPACE founders’ vision was to develop continuing education programs “For Nurse Practitioners, by Nurse Practitioners.” It was the first formal organization to focus on the continuing education needs of nurse practitioners.

The first NPACE conferences were held in the Greater Boston area. Over a twelve-year time span, NPACE continually expanded its reach. NPACE held its first national conference in Boston in 1992, with one thousand Nurse Practitioners from all over the country in attendance. NPACE began to expand its offerings to other geographic locations. Orlando, Florida became a regular venue for an annual National Primary Care Conference, followed by the Midwest, typically Chicago. In response to the ever-evolving role of nurse practitioners, NPACE soon added specialty conferences to its calendar; including women’s health, older adult health, alternative/complementary health and pharmacology.

From 1997 - 2005 the NPACE peer-reviewed professional journal, Clinical Excellence for Nurse Practitioners, was published first by Churchill Livingstone and then by Springer Publishing Company.

NPACE celebrated the beginning of its 25th year at the Boston primary care conference in November 2007. All founding members returned and were honored at this event.

Accreditation
NPACE is an approved provider of continuing education by the Massachusetts Association of Registered Nurses (MARN), an accredited approver of the American Nurses Credentialing Center's Commission on Accreditation.

References

External links
 

Nursing organizations in the United States
1980 establishments in the United States
Organizations established in 1980
Medical and health organizations based in Massachusetts